Arnaud Y. De Greef (born 12 April 1992) is a Belgian footballer who plays for KFC Voorde-Appelterre in the fifth-tier Belgian Division 3. He formerly played for Anderlecht, Westerlo and Eendracht Aalst.

References

External links

1992 births
Living people
Belgian footballers
Belgium youth international footballers
Belgium under-21 international footballers
Association football midfielders
R.S.C. Anderlecht players
K.V.C. Westerlo players
S.C. Eendracht Aalst players
FC Dordrecht players
K.M.S.K. Deinze players
Belgian Pro League players
Challenger Pro League players
Eerste Divisie players
Belgian expatriate footballers
Expatriate footballers in the Netherlands
Belgian expatriate sportspeople in the Netherlands